John A. Landau was a member of the Rhodesian Parliament who served as the Chief Scout of the Scout Association of Rhodesia, which has since become the Scout Association of Zimbabwe. In 1975, he was head of the Rhodesian contingent at the 14th World Scout Jamboree in Norway.

History
In 1966, Landau was the President of the Rhodesian Baseball and Softball League. In 1972, Landau was the manager of the Rhodesian Baseball team that competed in South Africa's inter-provincial tournament.

He was the Chief Scout of Rhodesia while holding parliamentary office, and played a role in the transitional government. In 2005, he was a member of the World Organization of the Scout Movement African Scout Committee for Honors.

In 1992, Landau was awarded the 222nd Bronze Wolf, the only distinction of the WOSM, awarded by the World Scout Committee for exceptional services to world Scouting.

References

External links

Recipients of the Bronze Wolf Award
Year of birth missing
Scouting and Guiding in Zimbabwe
Rhodesian politicians
ZANU–PF politicians
White Rhodesian people
White Zimbabwean politicians
Members of the National Assembly of Zimbabwe
20th-century Zimbabwean politicians